Dénes Dibusz (born 16 November 1990) is a Hungarian international footballer who plays as a goalkeeper and captain for Ferencvárosi TC.

Club career

Ferencváros
On 20 May 2015, Ferencváros beat Videoton 4–0 at the Groupama Arena in the 2014–15 Magyar Kupa Final.

On 16 June 2020, he became champion with Ferencváros by beating Budapest Honvéd FC at the Hidegkuti Nándor Stadion on the 30th match day of the 2019–20 Nemzeti Bajnokság I season.

On 29 September 2020, he was member of the Ferencváros team which qualified for the 2020–21 UEFA Champions League group stage after beating Molde FK on 3-3 aggregate (away goals) at the Groupama Aréna.

On 20 April 2021, he won the 2020-21 Nemzeti Bajnokság I season with Ferencváros by beating archrival Újpest FC 3–0 at the Groupama Arena. The goals were scored by Myrto Uzuni (3rd and 77th minute) and Tokmac Nguen (30th minute).

International career
Dibusz was selected for Hungary's Euro 2016 squad.

On 1 June 2021, Dibusz was included in the final 26-man squad to represent Hungary at the rescheduled UEFA Euro 2020 tournament.

Club statistics

Honours

Ferencváros
Nemzeti Bajnokság I: 2015–16, 2018–19, 2019–20, 2020–21, 2021-22
Hungarian Cup: 2014–15, 2015–16, 2016–17, 2021-22
Hungarian League Cup: 2014–15
Szuperkupa: 2015

Pécs
Nemzeti Bajnokság II: 2010–11

References

External links
Profile at HLSZ

1990 births
Living people
Sportspeople from Pécs
Hungarian footballers
Hungary international footballers
Association football goalkeepers
Pécsi MFC players
Barcsi SC footballers
Ferencvárosi TC footballers
Nemzeti Bajnokság I players
Nemzeti Bajnokság II players
UEFA Euro 2016 players
UEFA Euro 2020 players
21st-century Hungarian people